Goregaon Vidhan Sabha seat was one of the constituencies of Maharashtra Vidhan Sabha, in India. Goregaon is a tehsil in Gondia district. There is one more constituency by the same name in Maharashtra assembly, from Mumbai suburban area.

Members of Vidhan Sabha

 1962: Puranlal D. Rahangdale (Praja Socialist Party) 
 1967: Puranlal D. Rahangdale (Congress) 
 1972: R. Tulsiramji Harinkhede (Congress) 
 1978: Nagpure Girijashankarsinh Hemrajsinh (INC-I)
 1980: Girijashankar Nagpure, Indian National Congress (I)
 1985: Khushal Bopche (BJP) 
 1990: Chunnilalbhau Gopalbhau Thakur (BJP)
 1995: Khushal Bopche (BJP)
 1999: Rahangadale, Khomeshwar Natthulal (BJP) 
 2004: (Tanubhau) Hemant Patle, BJP     Subhash Desai (Shiv Sena) 
 After 2008 : Seat does not exist.

Election Results

1962 Vidhan Sabha Elections
 Puranlal Dharmabhan Rahangdale (PSP) : 19,271 votes 
 Pannalal Biharilal Dube (INC) : 15,303

2004 Vidhan Sabha Elections
 Patle Hemant (Tanubhau) Shrawan (BJP) : 51,209 votes 
 Baghele Dr. Zamsinghbhau (INC) : 48,435

See also
 List of constituencies of Maharashtra Legislative Assembly

References

Former assembly constituencies of Maharashtra